The State Department Store (Hungarian: Állami áruház) is a 1953 Hungarian musical comedy film directed by Viktor Gertler and starring Miklós Gábor, Kálmán Latabár and Kamill Feleki. The film is set in and around a Budapest department store, whose employees are battling against black marketeers.

Cast

References

Bibliography
 Mitter, Rana & Major, Patrick. Across the Blocs: Cold War Cultural and Social History. Psychology Press, 2004.

External links

1953 films
Hungarian musical comedy films
1950s Hungarian-language films
Films set in Budapest
Films directed by Viktor Gertler
1953 musical comedy films
Hungarian black-and-white films